P.O.P is the second album by The Mad Capsule Markets and their major label debut. It was a faster, thrashier effort than their debut album Humanity, and featured new guitarist Ai Ishigaki.

Track listing 
"Human Protest" – 1:17
 – 1:46
 – 1:51
 – 1:42
 – 2:53
 – 2:55
"Life Game" – 3:57
 – 2:38
"Yourself Look!!" – 3:29
"People Is Destroy of Mind" – 1:50
"White Low Child" – 2:26

Charts

Notes 

The Mad Capsule Markets albums
1991 albums